Jeffrey Richard Queen (born August 15, 1946) is a former professional American football player who played as a running back for six seasons for the San Diego Chargers, the Oakland Raiders, and the Houston Oilers.
Jeff developed into a top-flight running back in 1970, his first year at that position.  He led the Chargers in rushing and also caught 20 passes for 236 yards.  Jeff played tight end in 1969 after coming to San Diego as a linebacker.  He also excelled on specialty teams.

References

1946 births
Living people
Players of American football from Boston
American football running backs
Morgan State Bears football players
San Diego Chargers players
Oakland Raiders players
Houston Oilers players
American Football League players